Shedden, Ontario may refer to:

Shedden, Algoma District, Ontario, now called Spanish
Shedden, Elgin County, Ontario
 Shedden massacre, a 2006 gang-related crime
Coboconk, Ontario, known as Shedden in the 1870s